Feilding High School is a co-ed Secondary School (Year 9–13) in Feilding, New Zealand. It is the only secondary school in the town of Feilding.

History 

The school was originally named the Feilding Technical High School and subsequently became known as the Feilding Agricultural High School (FAHS). The school's foundation stone was laid on 7 February 1921 by the then Minister for Education the Honourable James Parr.  In 2000 the school had its name changed to FAHS Feilding High School.

In 2015 Feilding High School was rated as having at Decile 5 socio-economic rating. In 2018 Nathan Stewart was appointed as principal of the school.

Logo
Feilding High School's logo was gifted by Sir Peter Buck (Te Rangi Hīroa) in 1922. It also features on the crest of Manawatu District Council.

Notable alumni

 Bob Bell (1929–2011), former National Party MP
 Mihingarangi Forbes, television journalist
Ted Thomas (judge), Former judge of the Court of Appeal

Rugby players
 Mitchell Crosswell
 Nick Crosswell
 Sarah Goss, Black Fern, NZ Women's Sevens, Manawatu Cyclones XV and 7s representative
 Aaron Smith, All Black, Highlanders and Manawatu Turbos representative
 Codie Taylor, All Black, Maori All Black, Crusaders and Canterbury representative
 Adam Whitelock, Crusaders and Canterbury representative
 George Whitelock, Crusaders and Canterbury representative
 Luke Whitelock, Crusaders and Canterbury representative
 Sam Whitelock, All Black, Crusaders, and Canterbury representative
 Amy Cokayne,  England Women's Rugby, and Harlequins Women

See also
List of schools in New Zealand

References

External links
Education Review Office (ERO) reports for Feilding High School

 Boarding schools in New Zealand
 Educational institutions established in 1921
 Secondary schools in Manawatū-Whanganui
1921 establishments in New Zealand
Feilding